Bhujabalapatnam  is a village in Kaikaluru mandal, located in Krishna district of Indian state of Andhra Pradesh.

Government and politics 

Bhujabalapatnam gram panchayat is the local self-government of the village. The elected members of the gram panchayat is headed by a sarpanch. The current president is Gujjala Ramalakshmi.

References 

Villages in Krishna district